Muruiyeh (also Romanized as Mūrū’īyeh; also known as Mooroo’eyeh Siriz, Morū, Mowrū, and Muru) is a village in Siriz Rural District, Yazdanabad District, Zarand County, Kerman Province, Iran. At the 2006 census, its population was 590, in 145 families.

References 

Populated places in Zarand County